Michael Newberry is an American painter based in Idyllwild, California. He is a representational artist, blending a variety of influences, notably Rembrandt and the French Impressionists. His major works are typically life-sized canvases.

Education and early career
He began painting at age 11, after discovering Rembrandt.

He studied fine arts at the University of Southern California from 1974 to 1977 and was mentored by American modernist Edgar Ewing.

Teaching

He taught figure drawing, composition, and painting at the Otis/Parsons Institute in Los Angeles from 1990 to 1994.

Advocacy

He created and organized the Foundation for the Advancement of Art, which held a conference "Innovation, Substance, Vision: The Future of Art" at the Pierre Hotel in Manhattan on October 6, 2003, featuring speakers: philosophers Stephen Hicks and David Kelley, vision scientist Jan Koenderick, and sculptor Martine Vaugel. The mission of the Foundation was to recognize and promote innovative, contemporary representational painters and sculptors.

References

External links
 Online archive of Michael Newberry's works 
 Michael Newberry's website

Year of birth missing (living people)
Living people
20th-century American painters
American male painters
21st-century American painters
21st-century American male artists
Artists from Santa Monica, California
USC Roski School of Fine Arts alumni

USC Trojans men's tennis players
Royal Academy of Art, The Hague alumni
20th-century American male artists